Gerardus Josephus Xavery (27 July 1700, in Antwerp – after 1747), was a Dutch painter. He was the brother of Jan Baptist Xavery, the sculptor, and uncle to the brothers Frans – later his pupil – and Jakob. He was a native of Antwerp, but settled in Holland and practised at The Hague, becoming a member of the Pictura Society in 1741.

References

Further reading
Xavery, Gerardus Josephus in the RKD databases.

1700 births
18th-century Dutch painters
18th-century Dutch male artists
Dutch male painters
Artists from Antwerp
Year of death unknown